UN numbers from UN3201 to UN3300 as assigned by the United Nations Sub-Committee of Experts on the Transport of Dangerous Goods are as follows:


UN 3201 to UN 3300

See also 
Dangerous goods
Lists of UN numbers

References

External links
UN Dangerous Goods List
ADR Dangerous Goods List 2021
ADR Dangerous Goods substances

Lists of UN numbers